Cyperus mollipes is a species of sedge that is native to eastern parts of Africa, and parts of South East Asia.

See also 
 List of Cyperus species

References 

mollipes
Plants described in 1895
Flora of India
Flora of Thailand
Flora of the Central African Republic
Flora of Ethiopia
Flora of Kenya
Flora of Malawi
Flora of Mozambique
Flora of Myanmar
Flora of Rwanda
Flora of Somalia
Flora of Sudan
Flora of Tanzania
Flora of Uganda
Flora of Zambia
Flora of Zimbabwe
Flora of the Democratic Republic of the Congo
Taxa named by Karl Moritz Schumann